Palmer Island Light Station is a historic lighthouse in New Bedford Harbor in New Bedford, Massachusetts, USA. The lighthouse was built in 1849 out of stone rubble. It was discontinued when the harbor's hurricane barrier was built in the early 1960s, as its location immediately north of the barrier was no longer an outlying danger and there are lights on either side of the barrier opening.

From 1888 until 1891 it served, with Fairhaven Bridge Light, as a range light to guide vessels past Butler Flats, a rocky shoal on the west side of the entrance channel.

It was added to the National Register of Historic Places as Palmer Island Light Station on March 26, 1980.

Nomenclature
The USCG historical web site calls it "Palmer Island Light"
The current USCG Light List calls it "Palmers Island Light"
The National Register of Historic Places calls it "Palmer Island Light Station"

See also
National Register of Historic Places listings in New Bedford, Massachusetts

References

External links

 
 

Lighthouses completed in 1849
Lighthouses on the National Register of Historic Places in Massachusetts
Buildings and structures in New Bedford, Massachusetts
Lighthouses in Bristol County, Massachusetts
National Register of Historic Places in New Bedford, Massachusetts
1849 establishments in Massachusetts